Adriano Zendejas (born March 19, 1996),''', is a Mexican television actor.

Biography 
Zendejas was born on March 19, 1996, in  Mexico City, Mexico, has two sisters Samadhi and Dassana Zendejas. He began doing commercial television since childhood.  Zendejas studied acting at Televisa's Centro de Educación Artistica (CEA).

Filmography

References

External links 

1996 births
21st-century Mexican male actors
Mexican male film actors
Mexican male telenovela actors
Male actors from Mexico City
Living people
Mexican male child actors
Mexican YouTubers